The Parliament of Galicia is the unicameral legislature of the autonomous community of Galicia, Spain. It is formed by 75 deputies. Deputies are elected every four years in ordinary period, or extraordinarily upon dissolution and call of elections by the President of the Xunta of Galicia, by universal suffrage in proportional lists with the four Galician provinces serving as constituencies.

Functions
The Parliament:

Exercises legislative power.
Controls the executive branch or Xunta de Galicia.
Has power over the budget of Galicia.
Approves Acts and Statutes.
Appoints the senators for Galicia in the Spanish Senate
Appoints the President of the Xunta from among its members. 
Demands accountability from the President and Government of Galicia.
Has the ability to propose State laws to the Spanish Parliament and request further enhancements of the autonomy and self-government via organic laws.
Sponsors constitutional lawsuits to protect its devolved powers before the Constitutional Court of Spain.

Seat
The Galician Parliament meets at the Pazo do Hórreo in the Galician capital of Santiago de Compostela.

Elections 
The 75 members of the Parliament of Galicia are elected in 4 multi-member districts using the D'Hondt method and a closed-list proportional representation for four-year terms. Each district is entitled to an initial minimum of 10 seats, with the remaining 35 seats being allocated among the four provinces in proportion to their populations. Only lists polling above 5% of the total vote in each district (which includes blank ballots—for none of the above) are entitled to enter the seat distribution. However, in some districts there is a higher effective threshold at the constituency level, depending on the district magnitude.

The most recent elections were held on 12 July 2020 with the People's Party of Galicia (PP) remaining the largest party with 42 seats. The Galician Nationalist Bloc (BNG) won 19 and the Socialists' Party of Galicia (PSdeG–PSOE) won 14 seats. The next election is expected to take place in 2024.

Presidents

See also
Xunta de Galicia
Galicia
President of Galicia
History of Galicia
Galician Statute of Autonomy of 1981
High Court of Galicia

Notes

External links
Parlamento de Galicia 

 
1981 establishments in Galicia (Spain)
Galicia